Flying Colors is a studio album, released in 1992, by American country music artist Robert Ellis Orrall. Although it was his fourth studio album overall, it was his first and only solo album of mainstream country music, as opposed to his more rock-oriented albums in the 1980s. The tracks "Boom! It Was Over", "A Little Bit of Her Love" and "Every Day When I Get Home" were released as singles.

Although Orrall never recorded a solo album after Flying Colors, he would later team up with Curtis Wright to record one album as the duo Orrall & Wright. In addition, Orrall has recorded several albums of indie rock as a member of the band Monkey Bowl.

Reception
In his 4.5 star (out of a possible five) star review for allmusic, Roch Parisien said that "[Orrall]'s vocals come across with a throaty, good-nature[d] charm reminiscent of Huey Lewis."  He went on to say that "if you ever wondered what Huey would sound like with better melodies and a country backing, this disc's for you."

Track listing

AThe audio cassette version omits "'Til the Tears Fell".

Personnel
Compiled from liner notes.

Musicians
 Eddie Bayers - drums
 Bruce Bouton - steel guitar
 Richard "Spady" Brannan - bass guitar
 John Catchings - cello
 Bill Cuomo - keyboards
 Dan Dugmore - steel guitar
 Rob Hajacos - fiddle
 Paul Hollowell - keyboards
 Jerome Kimbrough - acoustic guitar
 Bernie Leadon - acoustic guitar
 Josh Leo - electric guitar, acoustic guitar
 Chris Leuzinger - electric guitar
 Brent Mason - electric guitar
 Vince Melamed - keyboards
 Steve Nathan - keyboards
 Robert Ellis Orrall - lead vocals
 Gary Prim - keyboards
 Michael Rhodes - bass guitar
 Tom Roady - percussion
 Leland Sklar - bass guitar
 Steuart Smith - electric guitar
 Bobby Taylor - oboe
 Biff Watson - acoustic guitar
 John Willis - electric guitar
 Lonnie Wilson - drums

Technical
 Mike Bridges - recording ("Flying Colors") only
 Jeff Giedt - engineering
 Dave Latto - second engineering
 Josh Leo - production
 Steve Marcantonio - production, recording, mixing
 Russ Martin - second engineering
 Robert Ellis Orrall - production
 Denny Purcell - mastering

Background vocalists
 Larry Byrom
 Paul Gregg
 Marcus Hummon
 Larry Michael Lee
 Robert Ellis Orrall
 Jim Photoglo
 John Wesley Ryles
 Karen Staley
 Larry Stewart
 Harry Stinson
 Dennis Wilson
 Lonnie Wilson
 Curtis Wright

"Boom-ers and Boom-ettes" on "Boom! It Was Over"
 Bart Allmand
 Barbara Behler
 Alison Booth
 Theresa Durst
 Paula Erickson
 Miranda Granger
 Jill Humphrey
 Zac Taylor-Jarrett
 Tavenner King
 Dave Latto
 Steve Marcantonio
 Judy Matter
 Greg McCarn
 Ginger McFadden
 Claudine Sartor
 Billy Spencer
 Carolyn Stewart
 Norman Taylor
 Dyanne Vinyard
 Shane Wilson

References

1992 albums
Robert Ellis Orrall albums
RCA Records albums
Albums produced by Josh Leo